Konrad Birger Knutsen (21 September 1925 – 2 October 2012) was a Norwegian civil servant.

He was born in Voss, and grew up in Bergen and Trondheim. He took the cand.jur. degree and worked at the Norwegian School of Economics and the Ministry of Local Government. He was appointed as chief administrative officer in Hetland municipality in 1958, as the youngest person in Norway to hold that position. When Hetland was incorporated into Stavanger municipality, Knutsen became chief administrative officer of technics. He then succeeded Andreas Cappelen as chief administrative officer of finance in Stavanger from 1967 to 1973, and County Governor of Rogaland from 1973 to 1981. From January 1975 to November 1981 he served as the State Conciliator of Norway. He was then the chief executive officer of the bank Rogalandsbanken from 1981 to its liquidation in 1987, then a lawyer.

During Knutsen's career in Stavanger and Rogaland, the city was chosen as headquarters for Statoil and the Norwegian Petroleum Directorate, and industry was expanded at Forus. He also worked for a University of Stavanger, which became a reality in 2005. Knutsen was also chair of Elf Aquitaine Norway and board member of the Norwegian Missionary Society and the Norwegian Seamen's Mission.

He was decorated as a Commander of the Order of St. Olav in 1980 and of the Legion of Honour in 1984. He died in October 2012.

References

1925 births
2012 deaths
People from Voss
People from Stavanger
Norwegian civil servants
County governors of Norway
Directors of government agencies of Norway
Norwegian bankers
20th-century Norwegian lawyers
Commandeurs of the Légion d'honneur